Ripon railway station was a railway station that served Ripon, North Yorkshire, England on the Leeds-Northallerton Line that ran between Harrogate and Northallerton.

History
Opened by the Leeds and Thirsk Railway on 1 June 1848. The foundation stone for the station buildings was laid on 18 September 1854 by Mrs. A. B. Patience, wife of the station master.

On 11 August 1866 Prince Edward and Princess Alexandra arrived at the station for a short visit to Studley Royal. They returned the day afterwards to catch the Royal Train to Barnard Castle.

It was taken over by the North Eastern Railway, which became part of the London and North Eastern Railway during the Grouping of 1923. The line then passed on to the Eastern Region of British Railways on nationalisation in 1948. It was closed by the British Railways Board to passenger trains in 1967, and freight trains in 1969, as part of the Beeching Axe.

Station Masters

Mr. Patience ca. 1854 – 1859
Matthew Peacock 1860 – 1872
Peter Donaldson 1872 – 1887
James Kitson 1888 – 1902
Henry Routledge 1902 - 1905 (formerly station master at Market Weighton)
Thomas Aitchison 1905 – 1925
John Proudfoot 1925 – 1933 (formerly station master at Haverton Hill and Port Clarence, afterwards station master at Malton)
H.J. Horsley 1933 – 1948
R.B. King ???? – 1961 (afterwards station master at Harrogate)
W.E. Wood 1961 – ????

Proposals for re-opening

Today much of the route of the line through the city is now a relief road and although the former station is still standing, it is now surrounded by a new housing development. The issue remains a significant one in local politics and there are movements wanting to restore the line. Reports suggest the reopening of a line between Ripon and Harrogate railway station would be economically viable, costing £40 million and could initially attract 1,200 passengers a day, rising to 2,700. Campaigners call on MPs to restore Ripon railway link.

In October 2015, North Yorkshire County Council included the reopening in its Strategic Transport Prospectus which was submitted to Transport for the North. In February 2016 the County Council included it in its Local Transport Plan, but it is accepted that it is unlikely to happen until after 2030.

References

Disused railway stations in North Yorkshire
Railway stations in Great Britain opened in 1848
Railway stations in Great Britain closed in 1967
Former North Eastern Railway (UK) stations
Beeching closures in England
Ripon